Meadow Flat is a locality in the Bathurst Region and City of Lithgow of New South Wales, Australia.

References 

Localities in New South Wales
Bathurst Region
City of Lithgow